Count of Echauz is a Spanish hereditary peerage title which was created by King Charles III of Spain and Naples in 1784 and bestowed upon José Manuel de Acedo y Jiménez de Loyola, heir of the Majorat of Loyola, Acedo and Lord of Riocavado.

History 

The Counts of Echauz are a branch of the Viscounts of Baigorri. The title was granted around 1033, in the High Middle Ages, by King Sancho III of Pamplona.

The name of the peerage refers to Echauz Castle, in the province of Saint-Étienne-de-Baïgorry, Lower Navarre, which was part of the Kingdom of Navarre, alongside the Bay of Biscay between present-day Spain and France.

Counts of Echauz

Family tree

References

Elenco de Grandezas y Títulos Nobiliarios Españoles. Instituto "Salazar y Castro", C.S.I.C.Fernández de Bethencourt, 1920.Nobleza española : grandeza inmemorial 1520, Juan Miguel Soler Salcedo.

Counts of Spain
Spanish noble titles